Chucklefish Limited is a British video game developer and publisher based in London. Founded in 2011 by Finn Brice, the company specialises in retro-styled games. Chucklefish is best known for developing Starbound and Wargroove, as well as publishing Risk of Rain and formerly Stardew Valley.

Games developed

Games published

Volunteer contributions controversy 
In 2019, Chucklefish were accused of exploiting around a dozen voluntary contributors during the development of Starbound, sometimes logging hundreds of hours with no compensation. Many of them were teenagers at the time and stated that they felt their inexperience was exploited by the company's director, Finn Brice. In a statement, Chucklefish said that contributors were under no obligation to create content or put in any particular number of hours.

References

External links 
 

British companies established in 2011
Video game companies established in 2011
Video game companies of the United Kingdom
Privately held companies based in London
Video game development companies
Video game publishers
2011 establishments in England